"Crook and Ladder" is the nineteenth episode of the eighteenth season of the American animated television series The Simpsons. It originally aired on the Fox network in the United States on May 6, 2007. It was written by Bill Odenkirk and directed by Lance Kramer.

Plot
Marge, following the advice of a parenting magazine, takes away Maggie's pacifier, leading her to destroy the inside of the Simpson home. Marge explains to Maggie that it's for her own good until Lisa reveals the magazine is by Larry Flynt Publications. The family runs out of spare pacifiers, so Marge sends Homer to buy a new one, but he cannot find the right brand, making Maggie cry. Luckily, Santa's Little Helper gives Maggie his squeaky toy, which calms her, but also makes Homer unable to sleep. He uses sleeping drugs, which causes him to unintentionally sleepwalk.

Taking advantage of this situation, one night, Bart and Milhouse have Homer drive them around town. When Homer abruptly wakes up, he crashes into the Fire Department house, injuring all the firemen. As they recuperate at a hospital, Homer, Apu, Moe, and Principal Skinner become volunteer firefighters. Mayor Quimby refuses to train them beyond a standard textbook, but the new team is quite efficient. After the first few fires, despite being initially against it, they are rewarded for their efforts.

This practice soon spoils the men, and when they save Mr. Burns's house and receive no reward, they feel cheated and steal some of his abundant treasures, claiming they were destroyed by the fire. From then on, they (except Skinner who wants no involvement with it) take items from the places they save and no one doubts their lie. However, Marge and the kids soon catch Homer in the act and Marge gets the kids to make sad faces around him everywhere he goes. Annoyed by this gesture, he decides to stop and convince the others to stop too after saving Moe's and Apu's lives. They then give their loot to the homeless.

Cultural references
The sleep medicine "Nappien" parodies two popular sleeping medicines. While the name is based on Ambien, the commercials feature a moth based on one used in similar commercials for Lunesta.

The episode features numerous references to TV and film, including Forrest Gump (Mr Burns floats like the feather and music from the film plays in a scene), and Punk'd (Apu pretends he's been reincarnated as a cat, then says "You've been Apu'd"). The music that plays during the montage of Bart, Milhouse, and Homer is "Frankenstein" by The Edgar Winter Group. When Bart discovers that Homer arranges the VHS tapes like dominoes, the cover of C.H.U.D. is briefly seen.

Critical reception
Robert Canning of IGN gave the episode a "Great" rating of 8 out of 10. He said the "delightful" show was a return to form, and praised its "great pacing, fun character interactions and laugh-out-loud moments". He noted that "the story was told with several fantastic, almost stream-of-consciousness segues that smartly linked comedic segment to comedic segment", resulting in the removal of "unnecessary and unfunny filler" - a problem that often "plagued recent episodes". He said that Marge hadn't been the focus of many episodes at that time, so her importance to this episode was a welcome development. He concluded his review by saying "This was a fun, well-crafted episode that had plenty of great laughs...It's been a while since a single episode could offer up such a list of memorable moments. ‘Crook and Ladder’ might just be one of those Simpsons episodes that never gets old."

References

External links
 

The Simpsons (season 18) episodes
2007 American television episodes